Spiritual Knowledge and Grace is a live album by drummer Louis Moholo-Moholo, saxophonist Dudu Pukwana, bassist and pianist Johnny Dyani, and saxophonist Frank Wright. It was recorded on June 22, 1979, at Jazzclub De Markt in Eindhoven, Holland, and was released in 2011 by Ogun Records.

The concert was intended to be a Blue Notes event, but leader Chris McGregor was delayed. However, Wright was in town and available, and accepted Moholo's invitation to join the group for the evening.

Reception

A reviewer for The Free Jazz Collective wrote: "the collaboration works well, because the South-Africans knew 'how powerful a Zulu Frank was', and it works really well, free form, floating and rhythmic and hypnotic like the free jazz of those days."

Sid Smith of All About Jazz stated: "Here, two 30-plus minute improvisations chart a series of heaving peaks and troughs into which ideas, lines and playful episodes are pitched and tossed with complete abandon... Dense, ebullient and tempestuous throughout, the near-telepathic, lightning-fast exchanges between these truly remarkable musicians is a marvel."

Point of Departure'''s John Litweiler commented: "At the start the three old partners don't quite seem to know what to make of Wright. But the music soon comes together, as jazz improvisation uniquely unites people, and by the end it sure sounds like brotherly love."

Writing for London Jazz News'', Alexander Hawkins remarked: "The... group dynamics are fascinating: the 'three and one' of the South Africans and their American guest; the 'one versus one' of two combative saxophonists each with plenty to say for themselves; the 'one and one' of the same two saxophonists, whose shared enterprise is to make music together; and the 'us and them' of a rhythm section on devastating form that day, seemingly offering infallible support at the same time as threatening to overwhelm anyone in their way."

Track listing
Composed by Pukwana, Wright, Dyani, and Moholo-Moholo.

 "Ancient Spirit" – 31:59
 "Contemporary Fire" – 36:59

Personnel 
 Dudu Pukwana – alto saxophone, piano, whistle, voice
 Rev. Frank Wright – tenor saxophone, double bass, voice
 Johnny Dyani – double bass, piano, voice
 Louis Moholo-Moholo – drums, voice

References

2011 live albums
Louis Moholo live albums
Dudu Pukwana live albums
Johnny Dyani live albums
Frank Wright (jazz musician) live albums
Live free jazz albums
Ogun Records live albums